The Mandel Q parameter measures the departure of the occupation number distribution from Poissonian statistics. It was introduced in quantum optics by Leonard Mandel. It is a convenient way to characterize non-classical states with negative values indicating a sub-Poissonian statistics, which have no classical analog. It is defined as the normalized variance of the boson distribution:

Non-classical value

Negative values of Q corresponds to state which variance of photon number is less than the mean (equivalent to sub-Poissonian statistics). In this case, the phase space distribution cannot be interpreted as a classical probability distribution.

Examples 
For black-body radiation, the phase-space functional is Gaussian.

References

Further reading
 L. Mandel, E. Wolf Optical Coherence and Quantum Optics (Cambridge 1995)
 R. Loudon The Quantum Theory of Light (Oxford 2010)

Quantum optics